Teemu Rintala is a Finnish sport shooter who is the former IPSC Rifle World Champion in the Open division from the 2017 IPSC Rifle World Shoot and Shotgun World Champion in the Modified division from the 2018 IPSC Shotgun World Shoot. He also has a bronze medal from the 2015 IPSC Shotgun World Shoot. Rintala has been one of the top IPSC Rifle and Shotgun shooters in Europe the last couple of years having placed well in the last Finnish, Nordic and European championships. Rintala shoots for 
Astro Sweden Rifle Team (formerly GP Rifle Team), and alongside the shooting he works as an arborist.

References 

IPSC shooters
Finnish male sport shooters
Living people
Year of birth missing (living people)